

This page lists board and card games, wargames, miniatures games, and tabletop role-playing games published in 1991.  For video games, see 1991 in video gaming.

Games Released or Invented in 1991

Game awards given in 1991
 Spiel des Jahres: Drunter und Drüber
 Deutscher Spiele Preis: Master Labyrinth
 Origins Awards:
 Best Roleplaying Rules: Vampire: The Masquerade
 Best Pre-20th Century Boardgame: Blackbeard
 Best Modern-day Boardgame: East Front
 Best Fantasy or Science Fiction Boardgame: Cosmic Encounter
 Best Roleplaying Supplement: GURPS Time Travel
 Best Roleplaying Adventure: Horror on the Orient Express (for Call of Cthulhu)
 Games: Trumpet

Significant games-related events in 1991
White Wolf, Inc. founded.

See also
 1991 in video gaming

Games
Games by year